Sudais Ali Baba (born 25 August 2000) is a Nigerian professional footballer who plays as a forward for Greek Super League 2 club Panserraikos.

Career 
Coming through the youth system, Ali Baba signed a professional contract with Super League Greece side Asteras Tripolis on 28 November 2018. He made his debut on 28 June 2020, in a 1–1 draw to Panetolikos. Ali Baba's first goal came during the 2020–21 season, scoring the 1–1 equalizer in the 76th minute against Atromitos on 6 March 2021. On 18 January 2022, Ali Baba was sent on six-month loan to Xanthi in the Super League 2.

On 9 September 2022, Ali Baba moved to Spartak Trnava in the Slovak Super Liga. In December 2022, Greek club Panserraikos announced the signing of Ali Baba for January 2023 on a one-and-a-half-year contract.

Style of play 
Ali Baba can play as either a striker or winger.

Career statistics

References

2000 births
Living people
Sportspeople from Kano
Nigerian footballers
Association football forwards
Asteras Tripolis F.C. players
Xanthi F.C. players
FC Spartak Trnava players
Panserraikos F.C. players
Super League Greece players
Super League Greece 2 players
Slovak Super Liga players
Nigerian expatriate footballers
Nigerian expatriate sportspeople in Greece
Nigerian expatriate sportspeople in Slovakia
Expatriate footballers in Greece
Expatriate footballers in Slovakia